is a Japanese politician of the Japan Communist Party, a member of the House of Councillors in the Diet (national legislature). A native of Kitakyushu, Fukuoka and graduate of Kyoto University, he was elected for the first time in 2004 after unsuccessful runs for the House of Representatives in 2000 and 2003 and for the House of Councillors in 2001.

References

External links 
 Official website in Japanese.

1963 births
Living people
Members of the House of Councillors (Japan)
People from Kitakyushu
Japanese Communist Party politicians